Unionville Public School is an elementary school located in the Unionville area of Markham, Ontario, Canada and is part of the York Region District School Board. It is a feeder school of Markville Secondary School.

History
Unionville's one room schoolhouse was built in 1832 just north of the present Unionville Public School. The school usually had 40 students and one teacher, though attendance at the time was irregular because extra help was often needed on the farms in the rural area the school served. The one room school was torn down in the 1860s, and in 1892 a new two-story school was built. In 1949 two new rooms were added and in 1955 a one-room annex was built. The two-story school was torn down in 1977 to build the current structure.

SPED ED
Unionville Public School has a large special education program. Many of the students in this program are integrated into regular classes to help create a more positive learning environment for all. The school has three Community Classes for children with autism. There are also children with physical disabilities who attend U.P.S, for whom special transportation is arranged. U.P.S has a room known as the Student Support Centre which provides a quiet learning environment for students who need it. The school also has a recess and lunch program called Peer Mentors where volunteer students sign up to provide support, advice, or just a friend to children with learning disabilities.

Extracurricular programs

Sports with Mark Copsey
Unionville Public School offers many sports teams for the junior and intermediate divisions. These include basketball, volleyball, track and field, relay, badminton, and soccer. U.P.S. teams compete against other York Region schools in tournaments.

Although sports are a large focus of extra-curricular life at the school, athletes are expected to remain abreast of their studies.

Music
Unionville Public School has a diverse music program led by the school's head music teacher, Mrs.Carroll

The U.P.S. concert band plays at the B100 level. The band holds practice twice a week during lunch recess, and has played in festivals such as the Ontario Band Association Festival, the York Region Music Alive Festival, and the Festival of Music at Canada's Wonderland. They consistently win awards.

The school's stage band attended the York Region Music Alive Festival where it has won numerous awards. It also performed in Markville Secondary School's Arts Night and Junk Food & Jazz concert.

The U.P.S. concert choir also competed in the York Region Music Alive Festival, where it has earned platinum and gold awards as well as invitations to nationals.

Additional Programs 

Unionville Public School also offers the following programs to its students:
 Peer Mentoring
 Guest speakers and workshops
 Student Leadership program

References

External links
School web Site
School Profile at York Region District School Board

York Region District School Board
Elementary schools in the Regional Municipality of York
Education in Markham, Ontario
Educational institutions established in 1832
1832 establishments in Canada